The Implementing Recommendations of the 9/11 Commission Act of 2007, is an Act of Congress.  The Act implements some of the recommendations of the 9/11 Commission including mandating 100% inspection of all air and sea cargo entering the United States, and a new method of redistributing anti-terrorism funding.

The bill also authorized the creation of Fusion Centers.

Legislative history
The bill  passed the House on January 9, 2007 by a vote of 299-128-8. It later passed the Senate with an amendment by unanimous consent. The two chambers of Congress went to conference, and a conference report in which the bill was amended and renamed the Improving America's Security Act of 2007 passed the Senate 85-8-7 on July 26, 2007 and the House 371-40-22 the following day. It was signed into law by President George W. Bush on August 3, 2007. It became Public Law 110-53.

The private sector preparedness requirements in the bill were based on the work commissioned by the Sloan Foundation to draft a framework for voluntary preparedness.

Short titles
 Implementing Recommendations of the 9/11 Commission Act of 2007
 Improving America's Security Act of 2007
 9/11 Commission International Implementation Act of 2007
 Advance Democratic Values, Address Nondemocratic Countries, and Enhance Democracy Act of 2007 or the ADVANCE Democracy Act of 2007
 Federal Agency Data Mining Reporting Act of 2007
 Improving Emergency Communications Act of 2007
 National Transit Systems Security Act of 2007
 Secure Travel and Counterterrorism Partnership Act of 2007

See also
September 11, 2001 attacks

References

External links

House Vote Roll Call, Accessed January 13, 2007
Implementing the 9/11 Commission Recommendations Act of 2007, on WashingtonWatch.com
USA Today story on signing of the bill into law
Congressional efforts to implement recommendations of the 9/11 commission at SourceWatch

Acts of the 110th United States Congress
United States federal defense and national security legislation
Surveillance